Gocea ohridana is a species of freshwater snail within the family Hydrobiidae,found in Lake Ohrid, North Macedonia, in a small area less than 10km2. It faces threats such as deforestation leading to erosion that can impact the snails ability to filter water; pollution from sewage coming from major cities adjacent to the lake; and an increase in fire hazards in the region. Because of its strict range, low abundance in findings, and threats to its specific environment, it has been classified as a 'Critically endangered' species by the IUCN Red List.

References 

Gastropods described in 1956
IUCN Red List critically endangered species
Endemic fauna of North Macedonia
Hydrobiidae